Charles Leich and Company is a historic factory building located in downtown Evansville, Indiana. It was built in 1887, and is a four-story, brick building. The building was originally built for the Evansville Woolen Mill, and Charles Leich and Company acquired it in 1914.

It was listed on the National Register of Historic Places in 1982.

References

Industrial buildings and structures on the National Register of Historic Places in Indiana
Industrial buildings completed in 1898
Buildings and structures in Evansville, Indiana
National Register of Historic Places in Evansville, Indiana